Monster High: Friday Night Frights is a 2013 CGI-animated adventure fantasy television film special produced by Nerd Corps Entertainment and released on 5 February 2013 on Nickelodeon in the United States.

It is the 5th television/film special based on the Monster High doll line by Mattel. Universal Pictures released it alongside Monster High: Why Do Ghouls Fall in Love? on 1 July 2014 as part of a Blu-ray release.

Plot
Monster High has had a centuries-old tradition surrounding the roller-skating competition "Skultimate Roller Maze" (SKRM). When they are opposing the Gargoyles, whichever team loses will get the other team's crest. In the latest game Monster High had their crest taken away after losing to the Granite High Gargoyles, as the opposing team had cheated. Without the crest the school is deteriorating at a rapid pace, making it a necessity to win back the crest as soon as possible, however the last game left many players too injured to play. Several of the girls decide to take on the Gargoyles themselves, much to the consternation of the boys, who claim that only boys can properly participate in SKRM. They also remind them of Robecca Steam, who tried playing but was allegedly demolished and never heard from again.

The all-girls team begins practicing and slowly improves, but is disqualified at their first match due to Frankie's nervousness. They don't allow this to dissuade them from playing and also find various missing parts that allow them to rebuild Robecca Steam, who encourages them to be themselves and continue playing. This gives them the drive to keep playing, especially after a female student transfers over from Granite High and joins their team. The team then manages to progress to the point where they are able to play against the Gargoyles once more during the finals. Despite some injuries, the Monster High team wins but choose not to take Granite High's crest as they know that this will cause the same decay in their school. Like the "tradition" of male-only teams, they see this as a harmful tradition that needs to be stopped.

The episode ends with a role call of the new co-ed team: Clawd, Operetta, Manny Taur, Gil Webber, Lagoona Blue, Heath Burns, Rochelle Goyle, and Robecca Steam.

Cast
 Laura Bailey as Lagoona Blue, Headless Headmistress bloodgood
 Ogie Banks as Clawd Wolf 
 Cam Clarke as Heath Burns, Romulus 
 Debi Derryberry as Draculaura 
 Andrew Duncan as Gary
 Erin Fitzgerald as Abbey Bominable, C.A. Cupid, Rochelle Goyle, Spectra Vondergeist
 Kate Higgins as Frankie Stein
 America Young as Toralei Stripe & Howleen Wolf  
 Julie Maddalena as Robecca Steam & Venus McFlytrap
 Audu Paden as Ghoulia Yelps, Announcer, Manny Taur & Nightmare
 Cindy Robinson as Jackson Jekyll & Operetta
 Salli Saffioti as Clawdeen Wolf & Cleo de Nile
 Ira Singerman as Eyera
 Evan Smith as Deuce Gorgon, Bram, Gil Webber & Rocco

Reception 
Dutch film critics magazine Cinemagazine gave a review for the TV special.  Renee Longstreet from Common Sense Media reviewed the latter of which praised it for its "positive messages about diversity" while criticizing it for "iffy body images." DVD Talk reviewed it as part of the bi-film DVD/Blu-ray release with Why Do Ghouls Fall in Love?, noting that they found the features entertaining.

Release titles by language

Monster High: Os Pesadelos de Monster High (Brazilian Portuguese)
Monster High: Fredagsfrygtløb (Danish)
Monster High : Les frayeurs du Vendredi Soir (French)
Monster High: Wettrennen um das Schulwappen (German)Monster High: Tromo-apolyto Protathlima Patinaz (Greek)Monster High: Péntek Esti Frász (Hungarian)Monster High: Fryktelig Forskrekket Fredag (Norwegian)Monster High: Monstruitas Sobre Ruedas'' (Spanish)

References

External links
 

Monster High
2013 animated films
2013 television films
2010s American animated films
Films based on fashion dolls
Films based on Mattel toys
Universal Pictures direct-to-video films
Universal Pictures direct-to-video animated films
2013 direct-to-video films
2013 films